Marita Böhme (born 7 May 1939) is a German actress. She appeared in more than forty films from 1962 to 2005.

Selected filmography

References

External links 

1939 births
Living people
Actors from Dresden
German film actresses